Jasper County High School is a high school in Monticello, Georgia, United States. The modern school was built in 2008.

Notable alumni
 Ulysses Norris, former NFL player
 Odell Thurman, former NFL player

See also
 Monticello High School (Monticello, Georgia)

References

External links
 Jasper County High School website

Public high schools in Georgia (U.S. state)
Education in Jasper County, Georgia